The Wales Book of the Year is a Welsh literary award given annually to the best Welsh and English language works in the fields of fiction and literary criticism by Welsh or Welsh interest authors. Established in 1992, the awards are currently administered by Literature Wales, and supported by the Arts Council of Wales, Welsh Government and the Welsh Books Council.

Competition format
The longlist of ten works in each language is published in April and the shortlist of three works in each language at the Hay Festival in May. The winners are announced in June or July. Since 2006, the winners have each received £10,000. From 2007, four runners-up (two in each language) also each receive £1000. In 2009, Media Wales sponsored a voted "People's Choice" award for the English-language works.

The format was again changed in 2012, expanding the entries to three categories, fiction, creative non-fiction and poetry; with English and Welsh language winners in each field. In 2019, a sub-category for books for children and young people was added, to be awarded from the 2020 award onwards. An overall winner in each language is still chosen.

Regarding eligibility, the competition specifically excludes self-published authors. The Welsh national book award therefore differs from Ireland's national book award, since the latter does not preclude self-published titles from being nominated.

Winners

English language

Creative Non-fiction
2016: Jasmine Donahaye Losing Israel (Seren) 
2014: Meic Stephens Rhys Davies: A Writer's Life
2012: Richard Gwyn The Vagabond's Breakfast (Alcemi)

Roland Mathias Poetry Award (discontinued)
2019 Ailbhe Darcy, Insistence (Bloodaxe Books) 
2016 Philip Gross – Love Songs of Carbon (Bloodaxe Books)
2015 Tiffany Atkinson – So Many Moving Parts (Bloodaxe Books)
2014 Owen Sheers – Pink Mist (Faber & Faber)
2012 Gwyneth Lewis – Sparrow Tree (Bloodaxe Books)

Welsh language

Fiction
2022: Ffion Dafis, Mori
2021: Megan Angharad Hunter, tu ôl i'r awyr (Y Lolfa) 
2020: Ifan Morgan Jones, Babel  
2019: Manon Steffan Ros, Llyfr Glas Nebo (Y Lolfa)
2016: Caryl Lewis Y Bwthyn
2015: Gareth F. Williams Awst yn Anogia (Gwasg Gwynedd)
2014: Ioan Kidd Dewis (Gomer)
2013: Heini Gruffudd, Yr Erlid 
2012: Jon Gower, Y Storiwr (Gomer)
2011: Ned Thomas, Bydoedd (Y Lolfa)
2010: John Davies, Cymru: Y 100 lle i'w gweld cyn marw (Y Lolfa)
2009: Wiliam Owen Roberts Petrograd (Cyhoeddiadau Barddas)
2008: Gareth Miles Y Proffwyd a'l Ddwy Jesebel (Hutchinson)
2007: Llwyd Owen Ffydd Gobaith Cariad (Y Lolfa)
2006: Rhys Evans Gwynfor: Rhag Pob Brad (Y Lolfa)
2005: Caryl Lewis Martha, Jac a Sianco (Y Lolfa)
2004: Jerry Hunter Llwch Cenhedloedd (Gwasg Carreg Gwalch)
2003: Angharad Price O! Tyn y Gorchudd (Gomer)
2002: Grahame Davies Cadwyni Rhyddid (Cyhoeddiadau Barddas)
2001: Owen Martell Cadw dy ffydd, brawd (Gomer)
2000: Gwyneth Lewis Y Llofrudd Iaith (Cyhoeddiadau Barddas)
1999: R. M. Jones Ysbryd y Cwlwm: Delwedd y Genedl yn ein Llenyddiaeth (Gwasg Prifysgol Cymru)
1998: Iwan Llwyd Dan Ddylanwad (Gwasg Tâf)
1997: Gerwyn Wiliams Tir Neb: Rhyddiaith Gymraeg a’r Rhyfel Byd Cyntaf (Gwasg Prifysgol Cymru)
1996: Sonia Edwards Glöynnod (Gwasg Gwynedd)
1995: Aled Islwyn Unigolion, Unigeddau (Gomer)
1994: T. Robin Chapman W.J. Gruffydd (Gwasg Prifysgol Cymru)
1993: Robin Llywelyn Seren Wen ar Gefndir Gwyn (Gomer)
1992: Gerallt Lloyd Owen Cilmeri (Gwasg Gwynedd)

Creative non-fiction
2016: Gruffydd Aled Williams Dyddiau Olaf Owain Glyndŵr (Y Lolfa)  
2014: Alan Llwyd Bob: Cofiant R. Williams Parry 1884 – 1956 (Gomer)
2012: Allan James John Morris-Jones

Roland Mathias Poetry Award
2016: Mererid Hopwood Nes Draw (Gwasg Gomer)  
2014: Christine James Rhwng y Llinellau (Cyhoeddiadau Barddas)
2012: Karen Owen Siarad Trwy’i Het

References

External links
Literature Wales: Wales Book of the Year
WalesOnline: Book of the year
Wales Book of the Year at lovethebook

British fiction awards
British non-fiction literary awards
British poetry awards
Welsh literary awards
Awards established in 1992
1992 establishments in Wales
English-language literary awards
Welsh-language literary awards